David Robert Mackay (born 2 May 1981) is a Scottish former professional football player and coach, and currently the assistant manager of Dunfermline Athletic. He played as a defender for Dundee, Brechin City, Arbroath, Oxford United, Livingston and St Johnstone. Mackay captained St Johnstone when they won the 2014 Scottish Cup Final. After retiring as a player in 2016, Mackay was then manager of Stirling Albion for two years, before returning to Dundee as first-team coach and then assistant manager alongside manager James McPake and briefly Mark McGhee.

Playing career

Dundee
MacKay started his senior career at Dundee and over the course of five seasons at Dens Park he played over 100 games for the Dark Blues as well as gaining further experience on loan to Brechin City and Arbroath, saying: "I just wanted to get away and play games". After gaining loan experience, Mackay's first-team opportunities increased at Dundee and he was in the squad for the Scottish Cup final, in a 1–0 loss to Rangers. When Dundee were placed in administration, Mackay was among those kept on, due to his low salary at the time. It was revealed that before administration, Mackay was offered a three-year contract. After the Scottish Cup Final, Mackay said he expected have his first team chances increase. At the end of the 2003–04 season, Mackay was offered a new contract at Dundee on reduced terms. Unfortunately, it announced that MacKay would be likely to leave Dundee when his contract will come to an end.

Oxford United
In the summer of 2004, his five-year spell at Dens ended when he was transferred south to Oxford United. Under the management of Graham Rix, MacKay established himself in the first team at Oxford United and at one point, MacKay played a role when he set up a goal for Tommy Mooney, in a 1–0 win over Cheltenham Town on 30 October 2004. By the end of his first season at Oxford United, MacKay had made 44 appearances for the club. MacKay have desire to fight for the first team following the arrival of Lee Mansell.

Livingston
After desire to coming back to Scotland for family reasons, Mackay returned to Scotland to sign for Livingston. MacKay made his debut for the club, in the opening game of the season, in a 3–0 loss against Rangers and scored his first goal for the club, in a 3–2 win over Hearts on 5 March 2006. Despite being ever-present player in his first season, the club, however, was relegated to Scottish Division One after finishing twelve place.

In his second season, MacKay started his season well when he scored five goals in first five matches against Queen of the South, Ross County, Partick Thistle, Airdrie United and Dundee. MacKay scored his sixth goal of the season in a 3–2 win over St Johnstone on 13 January 2007, four  months after he'd last scored. However, MacKay was unable to help the club get promoted back to the Scottish Premier League and went on to make 34 appearances and scored six times.

Mackay started the 2007–08 season well, scoring three times against Dunfermline Athletic, Morton and Clyde. In the fifth round replay of Scottish Cup, MacKay missed the penalty in the shootout, which eliminated Livingston out of the Scottish Cup. After the match, MacKay says he was in disbelief for missing the penalty. Later in the 2007–08 season, MacKay finished his season, with the club in the seventh position and Mackay made 34 appearances and scored six times, as he made the same appearance and goals last season.

At the start of the 2008–09 season, Mackay found his future in doubt after clubs from the Scottish Premier League made a bid to sign him, only to be rejected by Livingston. MacKay later admit that he considered handing a transfer request. Livingston also made changes with new owners and managers during the season, which made something very unexpected. McKay remained a key player to the club after the move to Scottish Premier League clubs never happened. MacKay then score his first goal for the club, in a 6–1 loss against Queen of The South on 4 October 2008, followed up by his second goal, in a 2–1 loss against Partick Thistle the following month and his last goal came in a 4–2 win over Ross County two months later. With the club's recent surroundings, MacKay hope the problem over the wages will be resolved soon. Later in the season, MacKay sustained a calf injury that kept him out for four weeks. MacKay was again in doubts, which saw him out for the rest of the season.

At the end of the 2008–09 season, Mackay was subjected to a bid, alongside Murray Davidson, from Scottish clubs like Dundee and Motherwell. MacKay was reluctant to leave Livingston and intended to stay there unless he received his money he was due in unpaid wages. Despite no intention to leave the club over unpaid wages, MacKay says he was glad to leave Livingston.

St Johnstone
In May 2009, Mackay transferred from Livingston to St Johnstone, who had won promotion to the Scottish Premier League. Three years on, Manager Steve Lomas praised his predecessor for his role of signing Mackay and Davidson.

Mackay made his debut for the club, in the first round of the Scottish League Cup, where he came on as substitute in the 71st minute, in a 5–0 win over Stenhousemuir and fifteen days later, Mackay made his league debut for the club, in a 2–2 draw against Motherwell. Having been in the first team as right-back, beating off competitions from Gary Irvine, Mackay would then score his first goal for the club, in a 1–1 draw against St Mirren. At the end of the 2009–10 season, Mackay made  40 appearances in all competitions, as well as, scoring once and then signed a two-year contract. Mackay says McInnes played a role for convincing him to sign a contract. Mackay was named as PA Sport/Easy Heat Systems player of the year.

In 2010–11 season, MacKay was soon appointed as a vice-captain and made a start in the opening game of the season against Hearts despite not fit, due to a back injury. However, during the match, MacKay had to be substituted in early of second half. As a result of being substituted, MacKay was sidelined for three weeks, which he played with broken back. MacKay would make his return on 11 September 2010, in a 2–0 loss against Motherwell. Later in November 2010, Mackay, again, sidelined with torn thigh muscle and made his return, on 11 December 2010, where he set up a goal, in a 2–1 win over St Mirren. Following his return, Mackay says his injuries, that he sustained in the first half of the season, is the most frustrating spell in his 12-year career. Despite the injuries he sustained during the season, Mackay would make 39 appearances in all competitions.

In 2011–12 season, Mackay started his season well despite losing two games of the first three games and then scored his first goal of the season, in a 1–0 win over Celtic, giving St Johnstone their first win at Celtic Park since 1998. Mackay then scored his second goal of the season, in a 2–0 win over Inverness CT on 15 October 2011. Despite the departure of McInnes and was replaced by newly Manager Lomas, MacKay first team place remained unaffected and scored two goals in two games against Hibernian and Hearts, which both games was a victory for St Johnstone. Then, in the fifth round of Scottish Cup against Hearts, with both side drew 1–1, MacKay was sent-off for the first time in his professional career, which left him surprised, though he was proud of the record. Mackay would miss the replay match in the Scottish Cup, which St Johnstone were out. At the end of the season, with St Johnstone qualify for Europe despite finishing sixth place, Mackay made forty appearances and scoring four times in all competitions. Reflecting on qualifying for Europe, Mackay reacted with mixed emotions, due to his sympathy for his former teammate James McPake, who played for Hibernian in the Scottish Cup, and his fears of not playing in Europe if FIFA barred Scottish clubs, citing ongoing situation at Rangers. At the end of the 2011–12 season, Mackay scored four times in 40 appearances in all competitions.

At the start of the 2012–13 season, Mackay was promoted as captain following the departure of Jody Morris, with his vice-captain role goes to Davidson. However, his start to the season didn't came well when he missed due to in the second round of the Europa League against Turkish side Eskişehirspor, which they lost 2–0. Mackay would make his return in the return leg, where he came on as substitute in the 60th minute, in a 1–1 draw, which St Johnstone are eliminated. Mackay would then score his first goal of the season, Mackay scored his first goal of the season, in a 1–1 draw against Ross County on 16 November 2012. After the match, Mackay says he dedicated the goal he scored against Ross County to his son, whose child died in April. He was then sent-off at the last minutes, in a 1–0 loss to Hibernian on 27 November 2012 and missed three match. In January 2013, he signed a two-year deal to keep him at St Johnstone until 2015. Shortly after signing the contract, Mackay scored his second goal of the season two days later, in a 3–1 win over Aberdeen. Mackay sustained a calf injury that left him out for three weeks and scored on his return, in a 2–2 draw against Dundee on 27 February 2013. In the last game of the season, Mackay played a huge role in helping St Johnstone qualify for Europe when he assisted the second goal of the game, in a 2–0 win over Motherwell. At the end of the 2012–13 season, Mackay scored three times in 36 appearances in all competitions and was named the StJFC Supporters Bus Player of the Year.

At the start of the 2013–14 season, Mackay played all four European matches for St Johnstone. After eliminating Rosenborg, Mackay told BBC Scotland about being proud of going through in the Europa League. Mackay was then one of the players to miss the penalty in the shoot-out when St Johnstone lose on penalty shootout against Minsk after a 1–1 draw on aggregate that led to extra time before it went to penalty shootout. After the match, Mackay was among Minsk's critics after criticising the club's antics. Mackay would then score his first goal of the season, on 17 August 2013, in a 4–0 win over Ross County. Mackay then score his second goal of the season, on 5 October 2013, in a 4–0 win over Inverness CT. Mackay would then score his third goal of the season, on 3 May 2014, in a 2–1 loss against Motherwell. Having played a huge role for the club in reaching the Scottish Cup final, Mackay was captain for the match and played as a right-back, as St Johnstone beat Dundee United 2–0. After the match, Mackay said that winning the Scottish Cup and the medal for the final was worth the wait, having been desperate to lift the trophy. As he lifted the trophy, Mackay recorded himself with GoPro from a unique angle.

At the start of the 2014–15 season, Mackay played all four European games and like MacLean, Mackey made amends for his missed penalty by emphatically scoring the third penalty in the Europa League 2nd Round Qualifier against Luzern at McDiarmid Park, after the match finished 1–1, 2–2 on aggregate. Then, On 31 July, Dave scored his first Europa League goal, a late consolation against Spartak Trnava to make it 2–1 to the Slovaks. After the match, Mackay criticised the club's performance in the first leg as "hopeless", though he believed the club had chances of winning the next leg. However, in the return leg, MacKay was unable to help the club overturn the deficit and they were eliminated from the Europa League. In a match against Celtic on 13 August 2014, MacKay received a second bookable offence after making a foul on Derk Boerrigter, when in fact Boerrigter had dived to win the penalty, as there was no contact from Mackay.
As a result, the club appealed Mackay's sending off and won after Boerrigter was charged and missed two matches. For Mackay, his suspension was lifted and he stated that Boerrigter's dive showed he had been innocent the whole time. Mackay's suspension was later overturned by the Scottish Football Association. Mackay later on continued to remain in the first team throughout the season and scored his first St Johnstone goal on 17 January 2015, in a 2–0 win over Partick Thistle. Mackay missed two matches due to a knock, but later returned to the first team. On 17 February 2015, Mackay signed a one-year contract extension. Mackay then made his 250th appearance on 25 April 2015, in a 2–0 win over Dundee. Mackay's season ended after having a hip operation, resulting in him missing the remainder of the 2014–15 season. Despite his absence, the club qualified for the Europa League for the third year running.

In the 2015–16 season, Mackay continued to rehabilitate his hip following an operation and missed the first two matches to the season, as well as, missing out two Europa League matches before returning to the bench against Ross County on 11 August 2015. Mackay made his return in the first team as captain in the next match against Dundee on 15 August 2015. Following this, Mackay remained in the first team and as captain until his sending off for second bookable offence, in a 1–0 win over Inverness CT on 24 October 2015. His form led him signing a one-year contract extension on 23 November 2015 and then scored his first goal of the season, in a 3–2 win over Ross County on 5 December 2015. However, Mackay's season ended early again in February 2016, after he required another operation on the hip injury he had suffered the previous season.

Ahead of the 2016–17 season, Mackay made his return to training after months on the sidelines with a hip injury. However, Mackay, once again, needed surgery on his hip after undergoing an injection. Due to ongoing problems with his hip, Mackay was forced to retire from playing professional football in September 2016. Upon retirement, Mackay was met with praise, with his teammate Steven Anderson describe him as the best player who has never been capped in Scotland, while his former Manager McInnes referred him as his perfect signing in his managerial career.

Coaching career

Stirling Albion 
After a spell coaching St. Johnstone U20s, Mackay was appointed manager of Scottish League Two side Stirling Albion in November 2016. Mackay was sacked by Stirling on 29 September 2018, after a 3–0 defeat against Albion Rovers.

Dundee 
In June 2019, Mackay was appointed first team coach and head of opposition analyses for Dundee under manager James McPake. On 26 August 2020, Mackay was announced as the club's new assistant manager. At the end of the 2020–21 season, Dundee achieved promotion to the Scottish Premiership via the play-offs.

On Boxing Day in 2021, following an injury crisis and a number of Dundee players needing to isolate due to a positive COVID-19 case, Mackay was forced out of retirement and was registered as a player for an away game against Aberdeen, though he remained an unused substitute. Despite McPake being released by Dundee in February 2022, Mackay would stay on as assistant manager under new manager Mark McGhee. On 22 June 2022, Dundee confirmed that Mackay had left the club by mutual consent.

Dunfermline Athletic 
On the same day that Dundee confirmed his release, Mackay rejoined James McPake and was named assistant manager of Scottish League One side Dunfermline Athletic.

Career statistics

Player

A.  Other includes UEFA Cup, Europa League, Football League Trophy & Scottish Challenge Cup

Managerial record

Personal life
MacKay married his wife, Laura, having been together since they both were eighteen, and have two children.

Honours 
Dundee

 Scottish Cup: runners-up, 2002–03

St Johnstone

 Scottish Cup: 2013–14

References

External links

1981 births
Arbroath F.C. players
Brechin City F.C. players
Dundee F.C. players
Association football defenders
Living people
Livingston F.C. players
Oxford United F.C. players
Sportspeople from Rutherglen
Scottish Premier League players
Scottish Football League players
St Johnstone F.C. players
Stirling Albion F.C. managers
English Football League players
Scottish footballers
Scottish Professional Football League players
Scottish football managers
Scottish Professional Football League managers
Dundee F.C. non-playing staff
Footballers from South Lanarkshire
Dunfermline Athletic F.C. non-playing staff